The  was a theatre at the  in Shibuya, Tokyo, Japan. The theatre opened in November 1985, and had a capacity of 1,200 seats. It closed on 30 January 2015.

References

External links 

Theatres completed in 1985
Former theatres in Japan
1985 establishments in Japan
2015 disestablishments in Japan
Buildings and structures in Shibuya
Theatres in Tokyo